The French word Autorail describes a single powered railcar capable of carrying passengers. While the concept faded for a while, it has been introduced with a new range of vehicles for both standard and metre gauge lines.

Many autorails from the 1950s and 1960s form the basic transport of many French preserved railways, of Chemin de Fer Touristique (sometimes Historique). They can be used at times of year when steam locos might cause fires. They have quick availability and do not require the specialized infrastructure needs of steam locomotives. Many lines have both steam and diesel traction, but steam is often reserved for peak periods and weekends. The power of these machines allows them to pull a small number of trailers if passenger loads necessitate.

X4200 Panoramique

One of the more sophisticated Autorails built was the Panoramique from Renault. The raised centre section was attractive to tourists in scenic areas.

Specification 
Passengers: 88
Freight: 
Engine: 1 MGO V122 SH
Power:  (820 PS = 820 cv)
Transmission: Electric
Mass: 
Overall Length: 
Max Speed:  (

Other Renault autorail models

 Renault ABH1, from 1935
 Renault ABH5, from 1942
 Renault ABH8, from the 1940s 
 Renault X 2800 from 1957
 Renault X 3800 Picasso, from 1955 and features a distinctive drivers cab
 Renault X 5500 from 1950
 Renault X 5800 from 1953

See also

 Autorail Bugatti
 Budd RDC
 Budd SPV-2000
 Micheline
 Railbus
 Railcar
 Railmotor
 Rail motor coach

References

External links
 Agrivap tourist train attraction with X 4200 and X 3800
 YouTube Movie of Autorail

Passenger rail transport in France
Railcars of France
French inventions